Pause is a 2014 Swiss comedy film directed by Mathieu Urfer. It was one of seven films shortlisted by Switzerland to be their submission for the Academy Award for Best Foreign Language Film at the 88th Academy Awards, but it lost out to Iraqi Odyssey.

Cast
 Baptiste Gilliéron as Sami 
 Julia Faure as Julia 
 André Wilms as Fernand 
 Nils Althaus as Lionel 
 Nicole Letuppe as Sarah

References

External links
 

2014 films
2014 comedy films
Swiss comedy films
2010s French-language films